1717 East Ninth Building, also known as the East Ohio Building, is a skyscraper in Downtown Cleveland, the U.S. state of Ohio's emerging Nine-Twelve District. Completed in 1959, it was one of the first modernist high-rises in Cleveland, along with the Illuminating Building.

History

It was designed by Emery Roth and Sons of New York City. Tishman Properties also of New York City was the developer. Ground was broken in March 1958 and in April 1959 it opened to the public. There is a 600-car parking garage attached to the tower. It was built on the site of the old Greyhound bus station, after Greyhound built a new bus terminal on Superior Avenue a few blocks away from the East Ohio Building in 1948.

East Ohio Gas, Cleveland's natural gas supplier, occupied the tower until its merger with Richmond, Virginia-based Dominion Resources. On the lobby level, East Ohio had a customer pay center and exhibits of the benefits of natural gas appliances. In addition, they had a meter showing how much natural gas was supplied to Cleveland.

On November 22, 2006, the largely vacant building was bought by New York City-based Sovereign Partners, LLC for around $12 million.  The buying group planned on making certain improvements to the building, the details were announced in early 2007. It was named to the National Register of Historic Places on January 23, 2013.

Conversion to apartments
Plans announced March 22, 2012 indicate that the tower will be converted to 223 apartments, eliminating a huge vacancy in the central business district and meeting strong demand for new living space. It will then become the tallest fully residential building in Cleveland, Ohio.

The K & D Group of Willoughby, Ohio recently signed a contract to buy the 21-story building. Apartments will fill that void by early 2014, if K & D succeeds in securing tax credits and other financing for its $65 million project.

K & D said it would open the first of 223 apartments in the downtown building in July 2014 and should finish the $65 million conversion by August 2015.

See also
List of tallest buildings in Cleveland

References

External links
 Residences at 1717
Emporis: 1717 East Ninth Building

Emery Roth buildings
Residential skyscrapers in Cleveland
Apartment buildings in Cleveland
Office buildings completed in 1959
Commercial buildings on the National Register of Historic Places in Ohio
National Register of Historic Places in Cleveland, Ohio